Jefferson & Poe is a lyric opera in two acts with music by Damon Ferrante and libretto by Daniel Mark Epstein.

Storyline 

The opera takes place at Monticello on a March evening in the early nineteenth century and portrays two love stories: one between an elderly Thomas Jefferson and Sally Hemings and the other between a young Edgar Allan Poe and the daughter of Jefferson and Hemings.

Awards 

The work received its premiere at Theatre Project in Baltimore and at Symphony Space in Manhattan in 2005.

References 

 Dale Keiger (February 2005). "Changing Their Tune". Johns Hopkins Magazine 
 Elise D'Haene (2 August 2007). "Exploring Opera's New Golden Age". The East Hampton Star

External links 
 Steeplechase Arts & Productions

Operas
2005 operas
English-language operas
Operas about writers
Works about Edgar Allan Poe
Cultural depictions of Thomas Jefferson
Cultural depictions of Edgar Allan Poe